The term seizure threshold is used to describe the balance between excitatory (glutaminergic) and inhibitory (GABA-ergic) forces in the brain which affect how susceptible a person is to seizures. Those diagnosed with epilepsy or certain other neurological conditions are more vulnerable to seizures if the threshold is reduced, and should be compliant with their anticonvulsant drug regimen.

Medications that lower seizure threshold include the antidepressant and nicotinic antagonist bupropion, the atypical opioid analgesics tramadol and tapentadol, reserpine, theophylline, antibiotics (fluoroquinolones, imipenem, penicillins, cephalosporins, metronidazole, isoniazid) and volatile anesthetics. So can other factors, including:

 sleep deprivation
 illicit drug use, such as cocaine
 withdrawal from drugs or certain stimuli
 fever
 exposure to flashing or flickering lights (photosensitive epilepsy) including neon lights, strobe lights, video games or even patterns like narrow stripes
 lengthy periods of fasting, malnutrition, starvation, high stress, fear, fatigue and exhaustion
menstruation
 uncontrolled diabetes, and
 other endocrine and metabolic irregularities like electrolyte or hormonal imbalances (for example, metabolic alkalosis)

Cancer and certain disorders of the nervous, cardiovascular and gastrointestinal systems can also influence the severity and frequency of seizures.

See also
Seizure trigger

References 

Neurology